E.B.A.H. (pronounced E-Bah. An acronym for "Evil Brain Angel Heart".) is the fourth EP by rapper Tech N9ne. It was released on September 18, 2012. It debuted on the Billboard 200 at #31, selling 14,000 copies in its first week.

Background
After completing the longest tour in hip hop history, the Hostile Takeover Tour 2012, Tech N9ne immediately returned to the studio to record his fourth EP release, E.B.A.H.

Guest artists
Guest appearances on the EP include Krizz Kaliko, J.L. of B. Hood & 816 Boyz, one of Tech N9ne's groups that includes Kaliko, Makzilla and Kutt Calhoun.

Track listing

References

Tech N9ne EPs
2012 EPs
Albums produced by Seven (record producer)
Strange Music EPs